Raymond Gary State Park is an Oklahoma state park located in southeast Oklahoma.

Park facilities include a fishing dock (handicap accessible), two unlighted boat ramps, picnic sites, recreational vehicle sites, six cabins, a swimming area and children's playground.

The park and the adjacent lake were named after Raymond D. Gary who served as Governor of Oklahoma from 1955 to 1959.

The park is 1 of 7 Oklahoma State Parks that are in the path of totality for the 2024 solar eclipse, with 3 minutes and 51 seconds of totality.

References

State parks of Oklahoma
Protected areas of Choctaw County, Oklahoma